Debojit Saha is an Indian playback singer and performer  mainly active in Hindi, Bengali and Assamese language films. Saha was the winner of Zee TV singing reality show, Sa Re Ga Ma Pa Challenge 2005 and was awarded the 'Voice of India' title. He was an anchor for singing reality show Zee Bangla SaReGaMaPa in the year 2006, 2007 and 2008 and he was also a celebrity contestant on Bigg Boss 2 in 2008 hosted by Shilpa Shetty. Debojit was seen as one of the Grand Juries for Zee TV SaReGaMaPa Lil Champs 2017.
The theme song of the "Namami Barak" Festival has been composed and conceptualized by Debojit Saha ( both Hindi and Bengali Version  ) held on 17 to 19 November 2017 at Silchar, Assam, India

Biography

Reality shows
Saha was placed in Ismail Darbar's "Yalgaar Ho Gharana" in the Sa Re Ga Ma Pa Challenge 2005. On 24 February 2006, he was announced the winner with the title "Voice of India". The competition was based on popular votes. Various organizations like the All Assam Students Union, the North East Students’ Union, the Srimanta Sankardeva Sangha and the Hindu Chatra Parishad campaigned in the Northeast states of India to vote for Saha.

He was one of the 14 contestants in season 2 of the TV reality show Bigg Boss.

He participated in STAR Plus's reality show Jo Jeeta Wohi Super Star. His talent was highly appreciated by music composer duo Vishal–Shekhar in this show. But he was voted out from the show.

He was also a participant in STAR Plus's show Music Ka Maha Muqqabla on the Team Shaan's Strikers.

Singing career
He has lent his voice in Bollywood movies 88 Antop Hill and Jimmy.

Debojit sang the song O more jaan in the Assamese film, Junda Iman Gunda. Simultaneously, he also performs at live concerts.

Discography

Albums

Film songs
 2007 – "O Mure Jaan" from Junda Iman Gunda.
 2008 – "Marhaba" from Jimmy
 2010 – "Happy Ending" from Tees Maar Khan  with Abhijeet Sawant, Prajakta Shukre and Harshit Saxena
 2011 – "Chu Chu" from Saheb, Biwi Aur Gangster 
 2012 – Four songs in Borolar Ghor

Television
 Debojit Saha participated as a celebrity contestant in Bigg Boss 2 in 2008, hosted by Shilpa Shetty and he was there in the house for 69 Days.

References

External links
 
 

1974 births
Assamese playback singers
Bollywood playback singers
Living people
Singers from Assam
People from Silchar
Sa Re Ga Ma Pa participants
Indian YouTubers
Indian male playback singers
Bigg Boss (Hindi TV series) contestants